Henrik Mestad (born 22 June 1964) is a Norwegian stage, film, and television actor. He received the Hedda Award in 2011.

Mestad was born in Oslo as a son of the politician Viking Mestad. He is educated at the Norwegian Theatre Academy and was hired at Nationaltheatret in 1991. 

As a dramatist, Mestad penned and starred in the plays Lik meg når jeg er teit (1993) and Nansens sønn (2002), both of which played at Nationaltheatret. On the screen, he has starred in Svarte pantere (1992), Vestavind (TV series, 1994–95), Sons (2006), The Art of Negative Thinking and Tatt av kvinnen (2007). In 2013-2014, he co-starred in seasons two and three of the Netflix original series Lilyhammer. From 2015–2020, he portrayed the Norwegian Prime Minister, Jesper Berg, in the political thriller Occupied. He played the Viking Chieftain Olav in seasons one and three of the Netflix original series Norsemen (TV Series) in 2017 and 2020 respectively.

References

External links
 

1964 births
Living people
Male actors from Oslo
Oslo National Academy of the Arts alumni
Norwegian male stage actors
Norwegian male film actors
Norwegian male television actors